Selena (Selena Quintanilla-Pérez, 1971–1995) was an American singer.

Selena may also refer to:

Music and media
 Selena (album), Selena's debut album
 Selena (film), a 1997 American biographical drama film about Selena
 Selena (soundtrack), a soundtrack album to the film
 Selena Forever, musical based on the film
 Selena y Los Dinos, Selena's Tejano band
 Selena's Secret, a 2018 American television series based on Selena's murder
 Selena: The Series, a 2020–2021 American biographical drama web television series about Selena

People
 Selena (given name), list of people with the name
 Selena (Dutch singer)

Fictional characters
 Selena Cross, from the novel Peyton Place, Return to Peyton Place and their film adaptations
 Selena (28 Days Later)
 Selena (Supergirl)

Other uses
 Selena Etc., South Texas-based boutique, salon, and clothing store built by Selena Quintanilla-Pérez
 Selena Auditorium, part of the American Bank Center entertainment complex in Corpus Christi, Texas

See also
 Selina, given name
 Serena (disambiguation)